Mofy is a Japanese-Italian stop-motion children's television short series. The series is produced by Associati Audiovisivi (with their animation brand Misseri Studio), Sony Creative Products, ZDF, and Rai Fiction.

The series is based on the characters of the picture books created by the Japanese illustrator Aki Kondo and published in 2008.

Premise 
The series represents stop-motion designs made of cotton wool, featuring a white bunny named Mofy. She goes on daily adventures to help her to understand and cope with her emotions.

Merchandising 
Takehiko Ohya, the manager of Global Business Group Licensing and Sony Creative Products says: 

The merchandise had been releasing apps, books and magazines, sticker books, digital publications, and, of course, plush, stationery, back to school, bedding, bags and purses, personal care items, DVDs, apparel, activity books, games, puzzles, toys and accessories. The appeal promoted with magazines, shopping malls, celebrities and retail corners as well as popular Mofy-themed live appearances, special events and even exhibitions. This success has now been transitioned to international marketplaces.

Broadcast 
The series is shown on several TV channels worldwide, among them: On Rai 2 and Rai YoYo in Italy, on NHK in Japan, on KiKA in Germany and Austria, in Channel 5's preschool block, Milkshake! in the United Kingdom, on Australian Broadcasting Company's ABC Kids in Australia, and Jeem TV in Arabia. NBCUniversal's Universal Kids acquired the series in the United States ran as the channel's shorts on May 20, 2019. In the United States, the show runs on Nick Jr.'s Noggin video subscription service app.

References 

Stop-motion animated television series
Italian children's animated television series
Animated television series about rabbits and hares
English-language television shows